Dmitri Obukhov (born July 9, 1983) is a Russian professional ice hockey winger who currently plays for HK Dukla Trenčín in the Slovak Extraliga (Slovak). He has formerly played in the Kontinental Hockey League (KHL), winning the Gagarin Cup twice with Ak Bars Kazan.

Awards and honours

References

External links

1983 births
Living people
Ak Bars Kazan players
HK Dukla Trenčín players
HC Neftekhimik Nizhnekamsk players
Metallurg Magnitogorsk players
HC Spartak Moscow players
Russian ice hockey forwards
Sportspeople from Kazan
Russian expatriate ice hockey people
Expatriate ice hockey players in Slovakia
Russian expatriate sportspeople in Slovakia